M. californiensis  may refer to:
 Mycena californiensis, a fungus species found in the coastal oak woodlands of California
 Medialuna californiensis, the halfmoon, an edible fish species found in the Pacific

See also
 List of Latin and Greek words commonly used in systematic names#C